Lamberto Arbaud was a Roman Catholic prelate who served as Bishop of Venosa (1510–?).

On 16 November 1510, he was appointed during the papacy of Pope Julius II as Bishop of Venosa. 
It is uncertain how long he served as Bishop of Venosa. The next bishop of record was Tommaso da San Cipriano who was appointed in 1519.

References

External links and additional sources
 (for Chronology of Bishops) 
 (for Chronology of Bishops) 

16th-century Italian Roman Catholic bishops
Bishops appointed by Pope Julius II